Carlos Maria Lugo Aquino (born 30 May 1976) is a Paraguayan football defender. He currently plays for Sport Boys in Peru. Lugo started in the youth divisions of Olimpia Asunción he then had a spell with All Boys in Argentina before playing in the professional squad of Club Cerro Corá. Lugo then moved to Cienciano of Perú where he was part of the team that won the Copa Sudamericana and Recopa Sudamericana. He is best remembered for his winning goal in the 2003 Copa Sudamericana final against River Plate.

Lugo also played for Club Nacional of Paraguay in 2007 and moved to Sport Boys of Peru in 2008.

Lugo also played for the Paraguay national football team in 2004.

References

1976 births
Living people
Paraguayan footballers
Paraguayan expatriate footballers
Paraguay international footballers
Club Nacional footballers
All Boys footballers
Cienciano footballers
2 de Mayo footballers
Expatriate footballers in Argentina
Expatriate footballers in Bolivia
Expatriate footballers in Mexico
Expatriate footballers in Peru
Association football defenders